Dominic Treadwell-Collins (born 26 August 1977) is a British television producer, known for his work on the soap operas Family Affairs and EastEnders, creating the EastEnders spin-off series Kat & Alfie: Redwater and Executive Producing the award-winning A Very English Scandal for the BBC and Amazon. In 2019, he set up his own television company, Happy Prince under ITV Studios.

Early life
Born Dominic Charles C.T. Collins, Treadwell-Collins adapted his mother's maiden as a double-barreled compound surname.

Treadwell-Collins' father, Michael J. Collins, was an Irishman who emigrated to London from Skibbereen, West Cork, in the mid-1960s. His mother, Linda ( Treadwell), is a hairdresser from Kilburn. The couple wed in Brent, London in 1975. 

When Treadwell-Collins was in his teens, his father died in a drowning accident on holiday at the family home in Fort Lauderdale, Florida, USA. As a child, Treadwell-Collins had ambitions to work for the BBC. He  lived in Radlett, Hertfordshire, near the BBC Elstree Centre, and used to look in through the gates.

Education
Treadwell-Collins attended Edge Grove School (an independent school in Aldenham, Hertfordshire), followed by Harrow School and the University of Oxford.

Career

Early work
Treadwell-Collins' first job in television was for the ITV crime drama series Midsomer Murders, devising means of killing off characters. He moved to Talkback Thames for four years, working as a story producer on the Five soap opera Family Affairs, where he was taught to storyline by Ian Aldwinckle. In 2007, he named the show winning the 2005 British Soap Award for "Best Storyline" the biggest achievement of his career. Family Affairs was cancelled in 2005, which surprised Treadwell-Collins, who had expected that several award wins meant the show would be extended. He felt that viewers remained "incredibly loyal" to the series, and that it would have had greater longevity had it aired on a different channel, or been better publicised by Five.

EastEnders
Treadwell-Collins began working on the BBC soap opera EastEnders in October 2005, as a senior story editor under Brigie de Courcy, before becoming story producer in January 2007. He was responsible for running the EastEnders story department, working with the show's writers to devise future storylines. 

In his first year on the show, he created the characters Ronnie and Roxy Mitchell, played by Samantha Womack and Rita Simons. In response to criticism of the show's lack of characters with disabilities, EastEnders producers planned to introduce several actors with disabilities in early 2009. Treadwell-Collins felt such characters are often portrayed as being unduly "noble" or "worthy", and suggested that EastEnders subvert this stereotype by making the new characters flawed. He created the storyline in which the Muslim character Syed Masood struggled to reconcile his faith and sexuality, and his relationship with Christian Clarke, as well as "The Secret Mitchell" and the "Who Killed Archie?" whodunnit, which culminated in the show's first live episode in February 2010. 

Treadwell-Collins stood down from his EastEnders role on 25 June 2010, becoming head of development at Kudos' Lovely Day production company. The company is run by former EastEnders executive producer Diederick Santer, who commented: "Dominic is a brilliant and original talent, bursting with great ideas and gripping stories. Many of EastEnders best storylines and characters of the last few years have come directly from his imagination and design, and he played an integral part in conceiving and plotting the hugely successful 25th anniversary episodes. I'm delighted to be resuming our creative partnership at Lovely Day." Treadwell-Collins stated: "I have had an amazing time at EastEnders and I couldn't have dreamed of a better place to work. Working on EastEnders has enabled me to create some fantastic storylines and characters that have been received so well but after four-and-a-half years of life in Walford, I feel that it is time to move on and try something new."

As executive producer
On 29 July 2013, it was announced that Treadwell-Collins would be returning to EastEnders as executive producer, taking over from Lorraine Newman, who resigned from the role after sixteen months on the job. He assumed the position on 19 August 2013 and his first episode as executive producer aired on 9 December 2013.

His first major cast change was to introduce Shirley Carter's (Linda Henry) extended family, who took over The Queen Vic – her brother (later revealed to be her son) Mick Carter (Danny Dyer), sister Tina (Luisa Bradshaw-White), Mick's common-law wife Linda (Kellie Bright) and their children Lee (Danny-Boy Hatchard), Nancy (Maddy Hill) and Johnny (Sam Strike). 

The family was later expanded to include Shirley and Tina's father Stan Carter (Timothy West), their maternal aunt Babe Smith (Annette Badland) and their estranged mother Sylvie (Linda Marlowe), plus Shirley's son Dean Wicks (Matt Di Angelo) who returned to the show after several years. Other major characters introduced by Treadwell-Collins include Dot Branning's (June Brown) grandson Charlie Cotton (Declan Bennett), Pam (Lin Blakley) wife of established recurring character Les Coker (Roger Sloman), Donna Yates (Lisa Hammond), Vincent Hubbard (Richard Blackwood) as Kim Fox's husband, Claudette Hubbard (Ellen Thomas) as Vincent's mother and Donna's adoptive Mother, and the Kazemi family -  Kush (Davood Ghadami), Carmel (Bonnie Langford) and Shakil Kazemi (Shaheen Jafargholi).

He reintroduced several characters who had previously featured in the show, including Sonia Fowler (Natalie Cassidy) Stacey Branning (Lacey Turner), Dean Wicks (Matt Di Angelo), Les Coker (Roger Sloman), Jane Beale (Laurie Brett), Kathy Beale (Gillian Taylforth), Honey Mitchell (Emma Barton) Jack Branning (Scott Maslen), and Steven Beale (Aaron Sidwell) who all returned permanently, while the likes of Peggy Mitchell (Dame Barbara Windsor), Nick Cotton (John Altman), Grant Mitchell (Ross Kemp) and Sam Mitchell (Danniella Westbrook) returning for guest appearances. The characters of Shabnam Masood, Rebecca Fowler, Ben Mitchell, Martin Fowler, Louise Mitchell, Jordan Johnson and Belinda Peacock were also reintroduced, but the roles were recast to Rakhee Thakrar, Jasmine Armfield, Harry Reid, James Bye, Tilly Keeper, Joivan Wade and Carli Norris respectively.

Treadwell-Collins also created a spin-off for the EastEnders characters Kat Moon (Jessie Wallace) and Alfie Moon (Shane Richie) set in Ireland called Kat & Alfie: Redwater, which started on BBC One and RTÉ One in May 2017.

Treadwell-Collins' decision to leave the show was announced on 18 February 2016. He described his choice as "not one I have taken lightly" and citied his reasons for leaving as wanting to "move on to other things". His final work on the show saw him produce the conclusion to the Who Killed Lucy Beale? storyline and produce the death of Peggy Mitchell (Dame Barbara Windsor). Of Windsor's request that he produce her exit storyline, Treadwell-Collins said "When Dame Barbara comes to you to produce her final episodes, you cannot say no." His final day at EastEnders was 6 May 2016.

Post EastEnders
Treadwell-Collins' new post as Head of Television at Blueprint Television was announced on 7 June 2016. Treadwell-Collins stated his admiration of films produced by Blueprints and his excitement to "develop their television arm". The co-chairman of Blueprint Pictures, Graham Broadbent, added that the company were "excited to have someone of his experience and calibre to launch Blueprint's TV side". Whilst at Blueprint, he developed and produced A Very English Scandal for the BBC and Amazon, starring Hugh Grant and Ben Whishaw, written by Russell T Davies and directed by Stephen Frears, winning Golden Globe, Emmy, Critics Choice, Rose D'Or, RTS and BAFTA awards. 

He left Blueprint in 2019 to set up his own label, Happy Prince, at ITV Studios. In 2022, he wrote and produced Holding for ITV and Virgin Media, based on the novel by Graham Norton and directed by Kathy Burke.

References

External links

1977 births
Living people
People educated at Harrow School
Place of birth missing (living people)
Soap opera producers
BBC television producers
British television producers
British people of English descent
English people of Irish descent